Suitors Duel is a novel by Douglas Niles published by TSR in 1995.

Plot summary
Suitors Duel centers around the quest for a goat which yields wine from its udders instead of milk.

Reception
Jonathan Palmer reviewed Suitors' Duel for Arcane magazine, rating it a 4 out of 10 overall. Palmer comments that "Written by an ex-high school teacher whose books have now sold over one million copies, this is a simplistic tale of treachery and love that will appeal to most of the younger members of his former pupilage. Nothing wrong with that, of course, but you have been warned."

References

1995 novels